Carl Gregor "Charles" Loew (1896-1935) was a French racing cyclist. He rode in the 1920 Tour de France.

References

1896 births
1935 deaths
French male cyclists